This is a list of academic journals published by MDPI. As of September 2022, MDPI publishes 399 peer-reviewed academic journals and nine conference journals.

References

External links
List of MDPI journals

MDPI